Daniel Gimeno-Traver was the defending champion, but chose not to participate this year.
3rd seed Karol Beck won this tournament, defeating Konstantin Kravchuk, Pablo Carreño-Busta, Henri Kontinen, Marco Chiudinelli and Grégoire Burquier in the final.

Seeds

Draw

Finals

Top half

Bottom half

References
 Main draw
 Qualifying draw

Singles
2011